Sarah Holland (born November 1961 in Folkestone, Kent, England) is a writer, actress and singer best known for her 22 romantic novels for Harlequin which have been published in over 130 countries, selling millions of copies worldwide. She has also written for television, newspapers and the screen as well as appearing in films; most notably the multi-award-winning Texan movie Artois the Goat (2009) and a supporting role with Academy Award-winning American actor Jack Palance in Treasure Island (1999). Holland wrote her first book, Too Hot To Handle at 18, and became one of the youngest romantic novelists in history when it was published in 1982.

Biography

Personal life
 Holland was born in November 1961 at Folkestone, Kent, England. The daughter of Sheila Coates Holland (best-selling novelist Charlotte Lamb) and classical biographer, ex-Times journalist Richard Holland, she has two sisters; poet and novelist Jane Holland and artist and singer/songwriter Charlotte Holland known as Miss Spooky Mooky, and two brothers Michael Holland and David Holland; both musicians and singer/songwriters.

Holland suffered epilepsy in her teens and had to leave Wanstead High School, London with a handful of O levels at sixteen. Subsequently, educated at home by her parents, who owned a private library of over 50,000 books, she moved to the Isle of Man with them in 1978 and, in 1980, began training to write at her mother's side.

Holland has travelled extensively, writing and researching in 56 countries and 5 continents,((cn)) many of which feature in her books. She has lived in 8 countries: England, Scotland, the Isle of Man, Hong Kong, Australia, Holland, France and the United States (Texas and San Francisco).

Holland currently lives in Scotland and works in Edinburgh.

Writing career

Because of the speed of her writing and the success of her books, Holland was nicknamed Mouton Cadet, a wordplay on Lamb's Daughter, by publishing brothers Alan Boon and John Boon, who then ran Mills & Boon. This industry nickname was later reported in the non-fiction book The Merchants of Venus: Inside Harlequin and the Empire of Romance by Paul Grescoe (1998). Holland was living in San Angelo, Texas in April 2008 when the FLDS Mormon-splinter sect case shot to international prominence and, as a contributing journalist, wrote about it for the San Angelo Standard-Times sparking a news debate as well as giving interviews to Texan news agencies including San Angelo Live.   In late 2008, Holland moved to London, England, where she worked as publication director for EMP Media's national celebrity magazine empire At Home Magazine for three years. In June 2011, she was appointed editor-in-chief of Victory House Publishing's La Creme Magazine. Holland is the subject of controversial blogs such as Wise Old Tom Kelly's Blog and Sarah Holland's Life Story - A Lawman's View

Influences
Holland is also an actress and singer and many of her books reflect this. The heroines of Bluebeard's Bride (1985), Adult Love (1991) and Desert Destiny (1991) are all singers and the books have music business backgrounds.   The Devil's Mistress (1982), Forbidden Passion (1991) and Blue Fire (1994) are all set in the film industry with both movie star heroes and heroines. The hero of Too Hot To Handle (1982) is a pop star; the hero of Red Hot Lover (1998) is a movie star.

Screen writing career
In 1995, Holland studied screen writing with Robert McKee in London and was invited to write a 6-minute teleplay for Island of Dreams, part of the Granada Television series, Being There.   Island of Dreams was nominated for Best Documentary of 1996 by the RTS (Royal Television Society) (Northern) and sold to over 13 countries. In 1999, Holland wrote a film screenplay, Abuse of a Dominant Position for Iron Pictures, Manchester Ltd.

Acting career

At 20, Holland enrolled at the London East 15 Acting School and embarked on an acting career which has included film, television and theatre. She performed Shakespeare for BBC 2's Bard on the Box series (1994) and won the supporting actress role opposite Hollywood superstar Jack Palance in Treasure Island directed by Peter Rowe; also starring Patrick Bergin and Kevin Zegers. Her Equity registered stage name is Abigail Rhode (Abby Rhode). She has appeared in a number of films through the Isle of Man Film Commission. In 2008, Holland played French author Eva Verrane in the award-winning film Artois The Goat, which she also narrated; it was directed by Cliff and Kyle Bogart and shot in Austin, Texas for the 2009 Sundance Film Festival with the world premiere at the SXSW Film Festival 2009 at Austin, Texas.  Artois the Goat gained a string of nominations and awards at international film festivals in 2009–10. Holland appeared as Audrey in the Summer 2013 production of Shakespeare's As You Like It in Hampstead, London and is appearing in the autumn 2013 season of Chekhov plays including The Bear, The Proposal and The Cherry Orchard. Sarah has also written theatre reviews, most recently for the opening week of Stephen Ward the Musical, music by Andrew Lloyd Webber, lyrics by Don Black and Christopher Hampton.

Music career
Holland is also a professional singer with over 20 years experience. She has performed blues, jazz and pop all over London and the Isle of Man.  She has been singing modern and classical music with St James's Choir London since 2009.

Television career
Holland has been the subject of three television documentaries. In 1982, BBC1's Nationwide made a 10-minute programme about her: – Young Writer at Drama School. In 1993, BBC 2 filmed Sarah Holland and Charlotte Lamb for the 50-minute documentary Paradise Road directed by Phillipa Lowthorpe. In 1996, a 30-minute documentary was made about Sarah Holland and Charlotte Lamb; Island of Dreams, Granada Television.

Works

Single novels
Too Hot To Handle (1982)
Tomorrow Began Yesterday (1982)
The Devil's Mistress (1982)
Deadly Angel (1982)
Fever Pitch (1983)
Bluebeard's Bride (1985)
Outcast Lovers (1985)
The Heat Is On (1988)
Adult Love (1990)
Desert Destiny (1991)
Forbidden Passion (1991)
Last of the Great French Lovers (1992)
Ruthless Lover (1992)
Confrontation (1992)
Extreme Provocation (1993)
Ungoverned Passion (1993)
Dangerous Desire (1994
Blue Fire (1994)
Master of Seduction (1995)
An Obsessive Love (1995)
The Dominant Male (1996)
Red Hot Lover (1998)

References

External links

 Fantasy Fiction Website
 Treasure Island Review
 Grescoe, Paul, 1998, The Merchants of Venus: Inside Harlequin And The Empire of Romance
 San Angelo Standard Times article, Texas – July 2008
 San Angelo Standard Times article, Texas – June 2008
 San Angelo Standard Times article, Texas – May 2008
 San Angelo Standard Times article, Texas – April 2008
 San Angelo Live with 2008 photographs
 Sarah Holland played French author Eva Verrane in Artois The Goat, Austin, Texas – 2008
 Artois the Goat SXSW article 2009
  EMP Media's celebrity magazine empire flagship at Home Magazine 
 La Creme Magazine 2011 
    Sarah Holland's Life Story - A Lawman's View
 Shakespeare's As You Like It
 Chekhov's The Cherry Orchard
 Stephen Ward the Musical - review December 2013

1961 births
English women novelists
English romantic fiction writers
Living people
People from Folkestone
Women romantic fiction writers